Ronald Lee Wolfe (September 3, 1930 – May 8, 1964) was the last person executed in the United States for non-homicidal rape, and second-to-last put to death for crime other than murder (the last was James Coburn, electrocuted in Alabama the same year for robbery). He was also second-to-last person executed in Missouri before the U.S. moratorium on capital punishment.

Early life 
Wolfe's mother disappeared when he was two weeks old and his father disappeared when he was 6 years old. He lived with his grandparents in his earlier years.

Crime, trial, and execution 
Wolfe, a 33-year-old man, was put to death in Missouri's gas chamber on May 8, 1964. He was convicted of brutal attack of an 8-year-old girl on October 18, 1959, near Troy, Missouri, just three days after his release from the federal penitentiary in Georgia for a car theft charge.

Wolfe's case drew nationwide attention once again in 2008 when the United States Supreme Court ruled in Kennedy v. Louisiana to ban the death penalty for child rape. The court directly cited Wolfe in court opinions.

References

1930 births
1964 deaths
American people convicted of rape
20th-century executions by Missouri
20th-century executions of American people
People executed for rape
People from Clarendon, New York
People executed by Missouri by gas chamber